Lamotte-Warfusée is a commune in the Somme department in Hauts-de-France in northern France.

Geography
Lamotte-Warfusée was created as a commune in 1974, by the joining of the ancient communes of Lamotte-en-Santerre and Warfusée-Abancourt.

Population

See also
Communes of the Somme department

References

Communes of Somme (department)